The 2020 Penn State Nittany Lions football team represented the Pennsylvania State University in the 2020 NCAA Division I FBS football season as a member of the Big Ten Conference. The team was led by seventh-year head coach James Franklin.

On August 11, 2020, the Big Ten Conference canceled all fall sports competitions due to the COVID-19 pandemic. On September 16, the Big Ten reinstated the football season, announcing an eight-game season beginning on October 24.

On November 21, after losing to Iowa, Penn State's record dropped to 0–5, the worst start in the program's history, dating to 1887. The team went on to win its final four games, finishing the regular season at 4–5. On December 19, the program announced that it was removing itself from consideration for a bowl game.

Previous season
The Nittany Lions finished the 2019 season 11–2, and had a conference record of 7–2. They received an invitation to the 2019 Cotton Bowl Classic where they defeated the No.17 Memphis Tigers 53–39. Penn State finished the 2019 season ranked No. 9 in both the AP Poll and Coaches Poll.

Offseason

Staff changes

2020 NFL Draft

Recruiting
The Nittany Lions signed 27 recruits during the 2020 signing cycle, securing the 15th ranked recruiting class in the country. This was Penn State's fourth consecutive top 15 recruiting class. 11 of the 27 signings in the 2020 class enrolled early.

Transfers

Returning starters

Personnel

Coaching staff

Roster

Source:

Depth chart

Schedule

Spring game

Because of the ongoing COVID-19 pandemic, Penn State, like other institutions, switched to distance-learning during the spring semester and canceled all sporting events.

Regular season
The Nittany Lions are a member of the Big Ten East Division, and will play all of the division's other six members. Cross-divisional opponents include the Iowa Hawkeyes, Northwestern Wildcats, Nebraska Cornhuskers, and Illinois Fighting Illini.

Three out-of-conference opponents were originally scheduled: a road game at Virginia Tech, and home games versus Kent State and San Jose State. However, these non-conference games were canceled on July 9 as a result of ongoing concerns with the COVID-19 pandemic. In early August, the 9-game conference schedule increased to 10 games, adding cross-divisional opponent Illinois.

A week later, the season was promptly postponed. On August 11, in the wake of multiple Group of Five conferences deciding to do so, the council of the Big Ten voted 11–3 to postpone fall athletics for the 2020–21 season (with all but Iowa, Nebraska, and Ohio State voting in favor). Commissioner Kevin Warren cited negative trends and uncertainties surrounding COVID-19 as a factor in the decision. The conference stated that it would evaluate options, including possibly playing in spring 2021 instead. After the decision to postpone the season, the Big Ten formed a taskforce to investigate options for a return to play. President Donald Trump criticized the Big Ten's decision to postpone fall football, as part of his general criticism of U.S. colleges and universities that have not resumed on-campus activities. All other Power Five conferences besides the Pac-12 (which also postponed its season shortly after the Big Ten's decision) were still planning to play in the fall.

On September 14, it was reported that the Big Ten was considering the possibility of reversing its decision and playing a shortened conference football season as early as mid-to-late October. On September 16, the Big Ten approved an eight-game conference season that would begin October 24, and conclude on December 19 (with the top seeds in each division playing for the conference championship, and all other seeds playing similar cross-division matchups). The conference is instituting a daily antigen testing protocol beginning September 30; PCR tests will be used to confirm positives found via antigen testing. Players who test positive on both tests will be removed from play for at least 21 days and undergo cardiac tests during this period, and will have to be cleared by a cardiologist before they can return to play. Positivity rates among participating teams and the local population will also be a factor: teams with a positivity rate above 5% or a population positivity rate above 7% will be required to halt all activity for seven days.

Penn State and Rutgers were the only 2 Big Ten teams to compete in all 9 regular season games. Following their victory over Illinois on December 19, Penn State opted out of a college bowl game appearance.

Schedule Source:

Game summaries

at Indiana

No. 3 Ohio State

Maryland

at Nebraska

Iowa

at Michigan

at Rutgers

Michigan State

Illinois

Statistics

Scores by quarter (Big Ten opponents)

Rankings

Players drafted into the NFL

Undrafted players 

Source:

References

Penn State
Penn State Nittany Lions football seasons
Penn State Nittany Lions football